The Ațintiș (also: Ozd) is a small river in the Gurghiu Mountains, Mureș County, northern Romania. It is a left tributary of the river Mureș. It flows through the municipality Bichiș, and joins the Mureș in the village Ațintiș.

References

Rivers of Romania
Rivers of Mureș County